Elana Susan Hill (born 28 May 1988 in Harare, Zimbabwe) is a Zimbabwean rower.  She represented Zimbabwe at the 2008 Summer Olympics in Beijing, China.

She went to school at Bishopslea Preparatory School and Arundel School in Harare. She excelled in rowing at Arundel School.  She is currently studying at the University of Pretoria.

Her best performance to-date was in the sea category at the World Junior Championships in 2006, where she finished 5th.

See also
Zimbabwe at the 2008 Summer Olympics

References

1988 births
Living people
Sportspeople from Harare
Zimbabwean female rowers
Rowers at the 2008 Summer Olympics
Olympic rowers of Zimbabwe
White Zimbabwean sportspeople
Alumni of Arundel School
University of Pretoria alumni